The Polish Academy of Sciences (PAN) is a Polish state-sponsored institution of higher learning.  Headquartered in Warsaw, it is responsible for spearheading the development of science across the country by a society of distinguished scholars and a network of research institutes. It was established in 1951, during the early period of the Polish People's Republic following World War II.

History
The Polish Academy of Sciences is a Polish state-sponsored institution of higher learning, headquartered in Warsaw, that was established by the merger of earlier science societies, including the Polish Academy of Learning (Polska Akademia Umiejętności, abbreviated PAU), with its seat in Kraków, and the Warsaw Society of Friends of Learning (Science), which had been founded in the late 18th century.

The Polish Academy of Sciences functions as a learned society acting through an elected assembly of leading scholars and research institutions. The Academy has also, operating through its committees, become a major scientific advisory body. Another aspect of the Academy is its coordination and overseeing of numerous (several dozen) research institutes. PAN institutes employ over 2,000 people and are funded by about a third of the Polish government's budget for science.

Leadership
The Polish Academy of Sciences is led by a President, elected by the assembly of Academy members for a four-year term, together with a number of Vice Presidents.

The President for the 2019–2022 term was Prof. Jerzy Duszyński (his second term in the post), together with five Vice Presidents: Prof. Stanisław Czuczwar, Prof. Stanisław Filipowicz, Prof. Paweł Rowiński, Prof. Roman Słowiński, and Prof. Romuald Zabielski.

On 20 October 2022, General Assembly of the Polish Academy of Sciences elected Prof. Marek Konarzewski to become the new President of the Academy for the 2023–2026 term. On 8 December 2022, another session of General Assembly of the Academy elected four Vice Presidents at the recommendation of the President Elect; as such Prof. Mirosława Ostrowska, Prof. Natalia Sobczak, and Prof. Dariusz Jemielniak, and Prof. Aleksander Welfe were elected as Vice Presidents of the Academy for the 2023–2026 term. 

All the Presidents of the Polish Academy of Sciences to date, by term, are as follows:

1952–1956: Jan Bohdan Dembowski
1957–1962: Tadeusz Kotarbiński
1962–1971: Janusz Groszkowski
1971–1977: Włodzimierz Trzebiatowski
1977–1980: Witold Nowacki
1980–1983: Aleksander Gieysztor
1984–1990: Jan Karol Kostrzewski
1990–1992: Aleksander Gieysztor
1993–1998: Leszek Kuźnicki
1999–2001: Mirosław Mossakowski
2002–2003: Jerzy Kołodziejczak
2003–2006: Andrzej Legocki
2007–2014: Michał Kleiber
2015–2018: Jerzy Duszyński
2019–2022: Jerzy Duszyński
2023–2026: (president-elect) Marek Konarzewski

Institutes

The Polish Academy of Sciences has numerous institutes, including:
 Hirszfeld Institute of Immunology and Experimental Therapy
 Nencki Institute of Experimental Biology

 Bohdan Dobrzański Institute of Agrophysics
 Museum and Institute of Zoology
 Kielanowski Institute of Animal Physiology and Nutrition
 Mammal Research Institute of the Polish Academy of Sciences
 Institute of Pharmacology of the Polish Academy of Sciences - established, 1954, became an independent institute in 1974; publishes the journal Pharmacological Reports.
 Institute of Psychology

 Institute of High Pressure Physics
 Nicolaus Copernicus Astronomical Center
 
 
 Polish Institute of Physical Chemistry
 Centre of Molecular and Macromolecular Studies, Polish Academy of Sciences in Lodz
 Department of Turbine Dynamics and Diagnostics of the Institute of Fluid-flow Machinery of the Polish Academy of Sciences

 Institute of Mathematics of the Polish Academy of Sciences
 
 Institute of Theoretical and Applied Informatics, Polish Academy of Sciences

 Institute for the History of Science, Polish Academy of Sciences
 Institute of Economics of the Polish Academy of Sciences
 Institute of Physics of the Polish Academy of Sciences

Notable members

 Franciszek Bujak, historian
 Tomasz Dietl, physicist
 Aleksandra Dunin-Wąsowicz, archaeologist
 Zofia Hilczer-Kurnatowska, archaeologist
 Maria Janion, scholar, critic and theoretician of literature
 Zofia Kielan-Jaworowska, paleontologist
 Franciszek Kokot, nephrologist
 Stanisław Konturek, physician
 Leszek Kołakowski, philosopher
 Roman Kozłowski, paleontologist
 Jacek Leociak, literary scholar
 Wanda Leopold, author, translator, and literature critic
 Mieczysław Mąkosza, chemist
 Zenon Mariak, neurosurgeon, professor
 Karol Myśliwiec, archeologist
 Witold Nowacki, mathematician (president of the Academy 1978 to 1980)
 Czesław Olech, mathematician
 Bohdan Paczyński, astrophysicist
 Włodzimierz Ptak, immunologist
Marianna Sankiewicz-Budzyńska electronics engineer and academic
 Andrzej Schinzel, mathematician
 Jan Strelau, psychologist
 Piotr Sztompka, sociologist
 Joanna Tokarska-Bakir, anthropologist and religious studies scholar
 Andrzej Trautman, physicist
 Andrzej Udalski, astrophysicist and astronomer
 Jerzy Vetulani, pharmacologist and neuroscientist
 Jan Woleński, philosopher
 Aleksander Wolszczan, astronomer
 Bernard Zabłocki, microbiologist and immunologist
 Stanisław Zagaja, pomologist, professor and director of Research Institute of Pomology and Floriculture

Foreign members

 Aage Bohr, physicist
 Zbyszek Darzynkiewicz, cell biologist
 Joseph H. Eberly, physicist
 Erol Gelenbe, computer scientist and engineer
 Martin Hairer, mathematician
 Jack K. Hale, mathematician
 Stephen T. Holgate, immunopharmacologist (2001)
 Ernst Håkon Jahr, linguist
 Krzysztof Matyjaszewski, Polish chemist working at Carnegie Mellon University
 Karl Alexander Müller, physicist
 Roger Penrose, mathematician
 Carlo Rubbia, physicist
 Peter M. Simons, philosopher
 Boleslaw Szymanski, computer scientist
 Chen Ning Yang, physicist
 George Zarnecki, art historian

Periodicals

Acta Arithmetica
Acta Asiatica Varsoviensia
Acta Ornithologica
Acta Palaeontologica Polonica
Acta Physica Polonica
Annales Zoologici
Archaeologia Polona
Fundamenta Mathematicae

See also
 Academy of Sciences
 French Academy of Sciences
 Polish Academy of Learning (headquartered in Kraków)
 Poznań Society of Friends of Learning
 Royal Society
 Warsaw Society of Friends of Learning

References

External links

 PAN website (click on British flag icon for English-language content)

 
National academies of sciences
National academies of arts and humanities
1952 establishments in Poland
Educational institutions established in 1952
Scientific organizations established in 1952
Members of the International Council for Science
Members of the International Science Council